Pylartesius strandi is a species of beetle in the family Carabidae, the only species in the genus Pylartesius.

References

Lebiinae